A United Nations Military Observer (UNMO) is a military official deployed by the United Nations to provide support to a UN mission or peace operation. Described as the "eyes and ears" of the UN Security Council, observers fulfill a variety of roles depending on scope, purpose, and status of the UN mission to which they are attached. A UNMO is generally tasked with monitoring and assessing post-conflict agreements, such as a ceasefire or armistice; the withdrawal of military forces; or the maintenance of a neutral buffer zone. Observers usually undergo special training to ensure neutrality, diplomacy, and deescalation techniques.

Duties and responsibilities
 Monitor the various agreements on cease-fires, withdrawals and demilitarization.
 Ground, sea and aerial patrolling of both sides of the conflict, including the areas along the confrontation lines.
 Patrol demilitarized zone.
 Help resolve local difficulties (social, economic, etc.) by liaison with all sides of the conflict.
 Investigate allegations of aggression or ceasefire violations.

Mission in Kashmir
An early and still-operating observer mission is the United Nations Military Observer Group in India and Pakistan (UNMOGIP), established on the India-Pakistan border in 1949 to monitor the ceasefire called for by the United Nations Security Council.
 Location and Headquarters: ceasefire line in Jammu and Kashmir states with major posts in Rawalpindi, Pakistan / Srinagar, India
 Primary observing officer: Croatian Major-General Dragutin Repinc appointed by Kofi Annan
 Participating observers: 113 military and civilian personnel, from 8 countries
 Casualties: 11
 Time frame: 1949–present

Similar mission in Timor-Leste
 Location and Headquarters: Republica Democratica Timor-Leste with major post in Dili, formerly East Timor
 Primary observing officer: Atul Khare appointed by Kofi Annan
 Participating observers: 34 with 1,600 supporting UN Police
 Casualties: 
 Time frame: 2006–present, previous missions UNAMET 1999, UNTAET 1999–2002, UNMISET 2002–2005, and UNOTIL 2005–2006

References

External links
United Nations Military Observers in Ethiopia and Eritrea (UNMEE)

United Nations Security Council subsidiary organs